"Please Don't Go" is a song recorded by the South Korean girl group 2NE1, performed as a duet by CL and Minzy. It was released as a digital single through YG Entertainment on November 20, 2009, although no accompanying music video was released to promote it. It was later included on 2NE1's debut studio album To Anyone in September 2010.

Background and release 
"Please Don't Go" was announced as a surprise single one day before its release on November 19, 2009. A source from YG Entertainment said that the single was a project that they were secretly working on for 2NE1's new album, which was originally intended to be released that month. However, the album release was postponed and no music video was produced in order to not let the staff around them know.

Commercial performance 
Upon its release on November 20, "Please Don't Go" overtook "You and I" by fellow 2NE1 member Park Bom for the number one spot on real-time charts in South Korea. On the Melon weekly chart, the song peaked at number 2 during the week of November 22–28, 2009, with 2PM's "Heartbeat" occupying number one. The song entered at number 30 on the inaugural chart issue of the newly established Gaon Digital Chart for the week of December 27, 2009 – January 2, 2010. It placed at number 82 on the monthly Gaon Digital Chart issue for January 2010, falling from number 7 from the previous month.

Live performances
The duo first performed the song live at the 2009 Mnet Asian Music Awards on November 21 as part of 2NE1's set, and was followed up with a performance at the SBS Love Sharing Concert on November 22. That same day, the duo began promoting the song on the music program Inkigayo, which they appeared on for several weeks.

Chart performance

Weekly charts

Monthly charts

References 

Female vocal duets
2009 singles
2NE1 songs
YG Entertainment singles
Korean-language songs
Songs written by Teddy Park
2009 songs